Kalidindi N. Satyanarayana is the Director of Indian Institute of Technology Tirupati. He is known for his pioneering studies on Building Technology and Construction Management. He also holds the chairmanship of the Academic Advisory Group, Project Management Institute (PMI) India.

Awards and honors
PMI (India) Distinguished Scholar Award (2011)
The Suchit Kumar Ghosh Memorial Medal (2002) from Institution of Engineers (India)
Chi Epsilon Award

Selected bibliography

References

Living people
IIT Madras alumni
Clemson University alumni
Academic staff of IIT Madras
Indian Institute of Technology directors
Year of birth missing (living people)